This is a list of events in Scottish television from 1972.

Events
 1 March – Border begins broadcasting in colour transmissions from the Selkirk transmitter.
14 March – BBC 1 Scotland has been on air for twenty years.
25 March – The 17th Eurovision Song Contest is held at the Usher Hall in Edinburgh. Luxembourg wins the contest with the song "Après toi", performed by Vicky Leandros.
11 September – Inaugural broadcast of Scottish Television's regional news programme Scotland Today. The programme is only broadcast for ten months each year, taking a break each summer.
Unknown – Construction begins on a new STV base in Renfield Street, Cowcaddens, Glasgow on land opposite the Theatre Royal site.

Debuts

ITV
11 September – Scotland Today on Scottish Television (1972–2009)

Television series
Scotsport (1957–2008)
Reporting Scotland (1968–1983; 1984–present)
Top Club (1971–1998)

Births
10 April – Gordon Buchanan, wildlife film-maker
16 August – Frankie Boyle, comedian

Deaths
29 January – Hugh McDermott, 63, actor

See also
1972 in Scotland

 
Television in Scotland by year
1970s in Scottish television